Wena railway station is a railway station on the Bakhtiyarpur–Tilaiya line under the Danapur railway division of East Central Railway zone. It is situated beside National Highway 31 at Wena in Nalanda district in the Indian state of Bihar.

References 

Railway stations in Nalanda district
Danapur railway division